Success is the fifth album by the Seattle alternative rock band the Posies, released in 1998. The band broke up after the album's release; they regrouped in 2005.

Critical reception
AllMusic called Success "the most laid-back album the Posies have recorded to date; freed of the glossy production of their Geffen years and of the major label pressure to record a 'hit,' they turned out an album that was more immediate, more relaxed, and more theirs."

Track listing 
All songs by Jon Auer and Ken Stringfellow.
 "Somehow Everything"
 "You’re the Beautiful One"
 "Looking Lost"
 "Fall Apart With Me"
 "Placebo"
 "Who to Blame"
 "Start a Life"
 "Friendship of the Future"
 "Grow"
 "Farewell Typewriter"
 "Every Bitter Drop"
 "Fall Song"

Personnel
Credits adapted from Discogs
The Posies
 Jon Auer - guitar, synthesizer, vocals
 Ken Stringfellow - guitar, vocals
 Joe Skyward - bass 
 Brian Young  - drums

Production
Conrad Uno, Johnny Sangster, The Posies - producer, mixing
Mark Guenther - mastering

Artwork and Design
Rusty Willoughby - cover art, design
Bootsy Holler - photography

References

1998 albums
The Posies albums
Albums produced by Johnny Sangster
PopLlama Records albums